Corton railway station was a railway station serving the village of Corton, Suffolk on the Norfolk and Suffolk Joint Railway line between Great Yarmouth and Lowestoft Central. The station opened on 13 July 1903.

The station was host to a LNER camping coach from 1935 to 1939 and may have had a coach visiting in 1935. A coach was also positioned here by Eastern Region of British Railways from 1952 to 1954, then there were two coaches until the end of the 1960 season. These were replaced  in 1961 by a Pullman camping coach which was joined by another Pullman in 1962 until all camping coaches in the region were withdrawn at the end of the 1965 season.

The station closed, along with the rest of the line, on 4 May 1970.

Corton is the only station building, apart from Lowestoft Central, remaining on the route of the line. It is currently in use as a private residence, the trackbed has been filled to platform level, and while the canopy is still in existence, it is looking very run down and forlorn.

References

External links
 Webpage including a picture of the station in 1974
 Corton station on 1946 O. S. map
 Corton station in late 1960s when one track had been removed.
Corton station 2007

Disused railway stations in Suffolk
Former Norfolk and Suffolk Joint Railway stations
Railway stations in Great Britain opened in 1903
Railway stations in Great Britain closed in 1970
Beeching closures in England
Waveney District